African socialism or Afrosocialism is a belief in sharing economic resources in a traditional African way, as distinct from classical socialism. Many African politicians of the 1950s and 1960s professed their support for African socialism, although definitions and interpretations of this term varied considerably. These politicians include Julius Nyerere of Tanzania, Kwame Nkrumah of Ghana, and Modibo Keita of Mali, among others.

Origins and themes 
As many African countries gained independence during the 1960s, some of these newly formed governments rejected the ideas of capitalism in favour of a more afrocentric economic model. Leaders of this period professed that they were practising "African socialism".

Julius Nyerere of Tanzania, Modibo Keita of Mali, Léopold Senghor of Senegal, Kwame Nkrumah of Ghana and Sékou Touré of Guinea, were the main architects of African Socialism according to William H. Friedland and Carl G. Rosberg Jr., editors of the book African Socialism.

Common principles of various versions of African socialism were: social development guided by a large public sector, incorporating the African identity and what it means to be African, and the avoidance of the development of social classes within society. Senghor claimed that "Africa’s social background of tribal community life not only makes socialism natural to Africa but excludes the validity of the theory of class struggle," thus making African socialism, in all of its variations, different from Marxism and European socialist theory.

African socialism became an important model of economic development for countries such as Ghana, Guinea, Senegal and Tanzania. While these countries used different models of African Socialism, a common thread of African Socialism emerged. This common thread was the desire for political and economic autonomy, self reliance, the Africanisation of business and civil service, Pan-Africanism and non-alignment.

History 
The first influential publication of socialist thought tailored for application in Africa occurred in 1956 with the release of Senegalese intellectual Abdoulaye Ly's Les masses africaines et l'actuelle condition humaine.

Women and African Socialism 
African Socialism proved to have mixed results for participating women. While some improvements were made from pre-developmental periods in the quality of life for women under African Socialism, setbacks and reflections of past gender hierarchies still persisted. 

In Ghana, newfound independence did not create a restructuring of old gender roles. Households were the building blocks of agricultural production and were almost exclusively headed by male workers. Accrued resources were then disproportionately controlled by household heads, under the assumption that subordinate women did not have to do as much work.

However, economic crises in the 1980s saw the women of agricultural households adopt new strategies for reviving local welfare, such as replacing imported products with local goods and migrant male labor with their own. The increased presence of these women in the socialist workforce elevated their position in the community and granted them a say in rural production. Groups of working women began receiving their own plots of land from community leaders, and their contributions became recognized under the rural basis of Ghanaian socialism.  Nonetheless, women who were not granted land often had to beg or receive permission from male landowners such as husbands or fathers. Without access to this land, local wives and daughters could not collect wild bush fruits or shea nuts, both crucial to financial welfare.

After the introduction of Ujamaa to Tanzanian life in the late 1960s, strict gender roles became commonplace and were celebrated as a pillar of nuclear family. Despite efforts of development policy to purge Tanzanian government of European influence, the reinforcement of nuclear family tradition and arrangement of women into the role of domestic house-maker reflected the practice of Christian colonizers before them. 

This was likely because newfound independence saw a political focus on stability in the early developmental stages of Tanzania’s government. Urban, working-class men unsure of the new government were seen as the greatest threat to national stability, and were provided improved salaries and access to housing which bolstered their position as household heads, and pushed women further into reproductive labor roles. Many of the goals surrounding Tanzanian women’s rights movements were nonetheless met, including improvements in education, employment, and political opportunities. Regardless, the slow but sure subversion of women’s rights movements in Tanzania saw women pushed further back into households, and female governmental leaders deposed for a number of trivial offenses. Still, Tanzanian villagization is recalled positively by many Tanzanian women, as it often provided the opportunity to live closer to kin, and commit to more stable marriage practices. Post WWII, pre-development economy had previously resulted in widespread serial monogamy, or the precarious and temporary marrying and remarrying which was seen as more survival strategy than romantic or reproductive endeavor. After resolving the discomfort of villagization, many women found advantage in their placement. For many Tanzanians, the crux of detriment towards women’s rights came with the structural adjustment of Ujamaa economic policies in the 1980s.

Across nearly all socialist states in Africa, women’s participation in politics did not face much improvement. In Senegal, Policies such as the “Code de la Famille” promised improvements for women’s legal protections, but represented a set of laws that women were more subjects to than authors of. In many cases, such reforms were only introduced because of lobbying by wives of well placed politicians. Symbolic representation via educated “femmes phares”, or beacon women, was introduced with the one party system, and a set of quotas for women’s political participation in the 1980s. Still, both concessions were more a result of male political competition than progressive movements for women’s rights. Even those women who were granted public office enjoyed little influence compared to male colleagues of similar position.  These developments reflected the predicament faced by eastern European women who received positions in symbolic organs of communist puppet-states. Real political power seemed to flow from the “inner circle” of such states. Power which was visible to the public in African nations was typically held by heads of state who were able to dominate and retain their position in a political monopoly.

African conferences for national liberation and socialism saw great participation from feminist organizations, but very little attention given to feminist issues. Nonetheless, developments were made with the unity of eastern feminist groups, but discourse with their western counterparts. With socialism and anti-colonialism at the forefront of African feminist issues, the question of how male leaders would make economic development benefit all members of a household was paramount, but one that was not taken seriously in conferences. Instead, feminist organizations were forced to drive international change on their own, often starting with the double standards and hypocrisies that could be found in their relations with other feminist groups. While feminists in Egypt were criticized for undemocratic practices in their developing government, countries like Britain seemed to escape scrutiny for its imperialist tendencies and improper treatment of its territories.

Relations to the Soviet Union 
In the early 1960s, at the height of the Cold War, Soviet Union based Africanists grappled with the concept of African Socialism and its legitimacy within the Marxist–Leninist theory. Leading Soviet Africanist, Professor Ivan Potekhin argued that African Socialism could not exist because there could be no varieties of true Marxist–Leninist socialism. There was not one monolith perspective on whether socialism existed in Africa. It was commonly believed that Africa could have its unique road to socialism but not its own form.

Soviet African Specialists recognized countries such as Guinea, Mali, and Ghana as closer to true Marxist–Leninist socialism. Ahmed Sékou Touré (1961), Modibo Keïta (1963) and Kwame Nkrumah (1962) were honored with Lenin Peace Prizes. Countries such as Senegal and Côte d'Ivoire were considered ‘reactionary’ and prone to collaboration with the imperialist powers.

Policies that were generally viewed as favorable by the Soviets were: economic independence, the creation of a national monetary system, a strong state sector economy, a state bank, state control over exports and transports, mutual assistance programs and common land ownership.

African Socialists argued in favor of a distinctive form of socialism because they believed that socialism had its roots in pre-colonial African society. According to them, African society was a classless society, characterized by a communal spirit and democracy on the basis of government through discussion and consensus. The main objective was to unite African people in this idealized image of the traditional pre-colonial society.

Soviet Africanists did not agree that African society had a traditional classless society.

African Socialist Kwame Nkrumah said, ‘African socialism is designed as an evolving African tradition. As such it is socialism of a special brand. And although African socialism may show some organizational resemblance to Communism, it differs from the Marxist socialist approach on vital points. Thus, African socialism rejects the doctrine of the economic class struggle and the inevitability of revolution. The economic class divisions of Europe thought parallel in African society, and the Marxist idea of a world-wide proletarian revolution is rejected in favour of peaceful national and international unification. Equally important, African socialism disapproves of the anti-religious sentiments of Marxism; after all, religion in traditional African society had been basic to social cohesion, and so religion should function today.’

Variants

Ujamaa 

The concept, or political ideology of Ujamaa, formed the basis of Julius Nyerere's autarkic social and economic developmental policies in Tanzania after Tanganyika gained independence from its colonial power Britain in 1961 and its union with Zanzibar to form Tanzania in 1964. The word Ujamaa comes from the Swahili word for extended family or familyhood and is distinguished by several key characteristics, namely that a person becomes a person through the people or community. Julius Nyerere's perceived African socialism as being embedded within African culture largely due to its communitarian model, a feature of African lifestyle that had been severely changed during the period of colonisation, and therefore took it upon himself to reestablish it.

Julius Nyerere went further in his idea of community living by rejecting the idea of multiparty politics for a young nation establishing itself like Tanganyika. His solution was single party rule because 'this unity is our greatest strength in the struggle against poverty, as well as against any outside enemies.

In 1967, President Nyerere published his development blueprint, which was titled the Arusha Declaration, in which Nyerere pointed out the need for an African model of development. That formed the basis of Tanzania's political vision for the years to come. Julius Nyerere partly based his declaration on the People's Republic of China as he had close contacts with them. Inspired by the Chinese experience of collectivisation under Mao, Tanzania followed a strategy of social equality and autarky.

Tanganyika was a very poor and rural country when it became independent in 1961. On Tanganyika's independence, Julius Nyerere declared that the country had three development problems: poverty, disease and ignorance. Nyerere also decided that rural development would take priority due to the fact that the country was largely rural.

Tanzania's rural areas were reorganised in autonomous communities on the basis of voluntary adhesion wherein the distribution of goods and living conditions were aimed to be as equal as possible. All decisions had to be reached by consensus within the village. The economy was reorganised with the purpose of valuing agricultural output, on the other hand the economic model worked on the assumption that peasants were able to pay back their loans.

The Ujamaa village policy was generalised in 1969, only to become obligatory in 1974 which broke the traditional principle of autonomous rule over the village. Nyerere's regime nonetheless remained less authoritarian than those of Nkrumah or Sékou Touré as for instance although a one-party system existed within Tanzania, elections could be disputed between two candidates. In spite of belonging to the same party this form of political confrontation allowed the direct competition of ideas within the party.

By 1975 65% of the rural community had been regrouped in so-called Ujamaa villages. The economic targets set by the Arusha Declaration had not been met and living conditions for poor farmers had not improved in the meantime. To add to Julius Nyerere's concerns, bureaucratic inefficiencies hampered effective distribution of resources and clear directives. Ujamaa is ultimately considered to be a political failure and Nyerere himself retired from the political scene in 1985. 
According to the BBC, "while he united his nation and made major advances in the fields of health and education," Julius Nyerere's African socialist "Ujamaa" collectives "proved disastrous for Tanzania's economy".

In 1977 when Nyerere took control of the Tanzanian economy, Nyerere realised that the economy had performed badly in agriculture and industry. Nyerere said 'the truth is that the agriculture results have been very disappointing' and that 'almost all our industry plants are running well below capacity; sometimes less than 50% of what could be produced with existing machinery is actually being manufactured and put to the market.'

However, by the late 1970s, Ujamaa had been abandoned since there was no incentives for peasants to exert themselves so rewards could not be reaped from their labour. Nyerere's Ujamaa ideology unraveled further during the early 1980s as corruption, failings in maintaining social services and failing to provide basic consumer goods for the rural majority. This undermined Ujamaa's legacy.

By the end of his political tenure, 96% of children had gone to primary school, 50% of them being girls. Female life expectancy had grown from 41 to 50.7 years between 1960 and 1980 and maternal mortality rates dropped from 450 per 100,000 births to under 200 by 1973.

Julius Nyerere – "The Basis of African Socialism" 
Julius Nyerere also wrote widely about Ujamaa in his essay entitled "The Basis of African Socialism". This essay was published in a TANU pamphlet in April 1962 and he argues that wealth distribution is the factor that separates capitalist and socialist countries. He also argues that the capitalist idea of gaining personal wealth has a wider community effect, because the pursuit of personal wealth indicates that one does not trust the social system of one's country. Nyerere believes that when a society cares about the people and that person wants to work, then the individual should not have to stress about their living situation.

Traditional African society also plays a big role for Nyerere with the creation of Ujamaa. In traditional African society, both wealthy and poor people were treated equally. For example, when natural disasters such as famine occurred, everyone was affected regardless of personal wealth. This is because resources such as food were a community asset so, if they were a member of the community, food would be provided to them.

Nyerere also acknowledges that capitalism was a product brought over by European nations through colonialism. Capitalism had a long-term impact on African society since the desire to compete and gain personal wealth increased in popularity amongst the general population. However, Nyerere believes that this only becomes a problem when this wealth is used to exploit people.

Therefore, the rejection of capitalist attitudes is a necessary progress in the journey of rejecting colonial ideals and rule. At the top of the Nyerere's list is the rejection of individual ownership of land because the concept of buying a piece of land and charging rent is exploitative since landlords do not need to work to earn their living. He proposes that TANU government should revert to the traditional ways of landholding by providing everyone with a piece of land with the condition that the land is used.

Finally, Nyerere ends the essay by emphasising the importance of unity to break from colonialism and the importance of merging traditional African living with African socialism.

Ubuntu 
The ancient Ubuntu philosophy of South Africa recognizes the humanity of a person through their interpersonal relationships. The word comes from the Zulu and Xhosa languages. Ubuntu believes in a bond that ties together all of humanity and the fact that a human being is of a high value. According to Archbishop Desmond Tutu, A man with ubuntu is open and accessible to others, confirming of others, doesn't feel debilitated that others are capable and great, for he or she has a legitimate confidence that originates from realizing that he or she has a place in a more noteworthy entire and is decreased when others are mortified or reduced, when others are tormented or abused.

Harambee 
Harambee is a term that originated among natives, specifically Swahili porters of East Africa; the word harambee traditionally means "let us pull together". It was taken as an opportunity for local Kenyans to self-develop their communities without waiting on government. This helped build a sense of togetherness in the Kenyan community but analysts state that it has brought about class discrepancies because some individuals use this as an opportunity to generate wealth.

Kwame Nkrumah and Nkrumahism 
Nkrumahism was the political philosophy of Ghana's first post-independence president Kwame Nkrumah. As one of the first African political leaders, Nkrumah became a major figure in the left-wing pan-African movement. In his piece A declaration to the colonial peoples, Nkrumah called on Africans to "...affirm the right of all colonial peoples to control their own destiny." and that "All colonies must be free from foreign imperialist control, whether political or economic.". His focus on economic and political freedom would prove to be a fundamental part of his overarching political philosophy, combining the nationalist independence movement in his home country of Ghana along with left-wing economic thought.

A major figure in the Ghanaian independence movement, Nkrumah came to power shortly after Ghana gained its independence in 1957. Once in power, he began a series of infrastructural and economic development plans designed to stimulate the Ghanaian economy. $16 million was designated to be used to build a new town in Tema to be used as an open seaport for Accra and the eastern region of the country. The government designed a new plan to tackle issues surrounding illiteracy and lack of access to education, with thousands of new schools being built in rural areas.

Determined to industrialize the country rapidly, Nkrumah set out to modernize Ghana's economy in order to better compete with the West. In turn, his government embarked on a strategy of slowly increasing the amount of government-controlled firms in the country while simultaneously putting restrictions on privately owned companies operating in Ghana. By 1965, the state-controlled 50% of the insurance industry within the country, 60% of all bank deposits were deposited at state-run banks, 17% of the country's sea-bound cargo was handled by state-run firms, 27% of all industrial production was either produced by state-run firms or firms in which the state-controlled a considerable portion and 35% of the country's total imports were handled by the government.

Nkrumah also pushed for Ghana to become an international advocate for the spread of socialism and pan-Africanism throughout the newly independent African states. As the first African colonial state to be granted independence, Ghana became an inspiration to many of the nascent left-wing independence movements throughout the continent. In 1958, Nkrumah helped found the Union of Independent African States, a political union between Ghana, Mali, and Guinea. Though the union was short-lived, the proposed political organization marked the first attempt at regional unity among newly established African republics.

Nkrumah was also instrumental in pushing Ghana towards the major Communist powers, including the USSR and the PRC. In 1961, he made his first official visit to Moscow, receiving an honorary degree from the University of Moscow. In a speech given in Accra given in front of a visiting Soviet delegation in 1963, Nkrumah said, "We in Ghana have formally chosen the socialist path and we will build a socialist society... Thus our countries, the Soviet Union and Ghana, will go forward together."

Nkrumah also used the Eastern bloc to expand Ghana's economy by establishing state owned enterprises. In 1962, a Ghanaian newspaper reported that out of the sixty-three foreign agreements signed in 1961, forty-four of the agreements were with East European countries focusing on trade, payments and scientific, technical, and cultural co-operation. There was also five agreements with China and another five with Yugoslavia.

Léopold Sédar Senghor and the Socialist Party of Senegal 
Léopold Senghor was the founder of the Socialist Party of Senegal and the first President of the country. An important figure not only in the political development of the country, but Senghor was also one of the leading figures in the Négritude movement, which informed much of his political thought. Senghor would come to embody a new form of African socialism that rejected many of the traditional Marxist modes of thinking that had developed in post-independence Africa.

Born into an upper-middle-class family, Senghor was able to take advantage of the French educational system that was afforded to many of Africa's educated colonial elite. However, these schools did little to teach African students about their native culture, instead favoring policies of assimilation into mainstream French life. As Senghor once put it the French wanted "bread for all, culture for all, liberty for all; but this liberty, this culture, and this bread will be French." Excelling in his primary education, Senghor enrolled in the University of Paris.

After graduating and serving in the French Army during the Second World War, Senghor began a career as a poet in Paris, releasing his first book, Chants d'ombre (Shadow Songs)  in 1945 and Anthologie de la nouvelle poésie nègre et malagache de lengue française (Anthology of the New Black and Malagasy Poetry in 1948. Both pieces were instrumental in developing the bulk of the emerging Négretude movement, which Senghor hoped would represent the "sum total of the values of the civilization of the African world.".

His work highlighted the vast inequalities in French colonial society and looked at the unique experience of the thousands of Africans living under French rule. In his piece The Challenge of Culture in French West Africa, Senghor called on Africans to "develop a culture based on the strengths of local tradition that was also open to the modern European world".

Senghor was initially not a supporter of an independent Senegal, worrying that the small African country would have little chance as an independent nation. Instead, he advocated for an interconnected relationship similar to that of Paris and France's provinces. In his piece, Vues sure l'Afrique noir, ou s'assumiler non être assimilés (Views on Black Africa, or To Assimilate, Not Be Assimilated), Senghor advocated for popularly elected Senegelese representatives and an executive in Paris, French economic funds to help with Senegalese development, and the inclusion of African cultural and linguistic education in the French educational system.

In 1958, referendums were held in all of the French African colonies on the future of the colonial possessions. The debate was between full on independence and joining the French community, a sort of association of former French colonies that would allow countries like Senegal to become independent, but still maintain an economic and diplomatic relations with the French government. Senghor supported the yes side of the vote and Senegal voted 97% in favor of the association.

When Senegal became a fully independent country in 1960, Senghor was elected to the presidency. After a failed coup led by his Prime Minister in 1962, the Senghor government moved to abolish the post, which was approved by 99% in referendum. The vote substantially strengthened the power of the President, who no longer had to compete with the Prime Minister for executive power.

The Socialist Party compounded its control of Senegalese politics in 1966 when it was declared the country's only legal party, with Senghor as its leader. The one-party system would stay in place until Senghor decided to liberalize the country's election laws by allowing for a 3 party system, with one socialist, one liberal, and one communist party being allowed to contest elections.

As president, Senghor represented a moderated version of African Socialism that didn't align with the more radical interpretations seen in other newly independent African states. Unlike other ex-colonies, Senegal remained closely aligned with the French government. They retained the French Franc as the national currency and Senghor was known to consult the French government before making any major foreign policy decisions. He allowed French advisors and companies to remain in Senegal, including in government and educational posts. When asked about nationalizing French companies, Senghor responded that it would be to "kill the goose that laid the golden egg". His government invested heavily in both education and the public sector, investing 12-15 billion francs and 6 to 9 billion francs in both sectors respectively. He also sought to give more power to the underdeveloped Senegalese countryside which he did by instituting price protections on peanut crops and allowing for rural representation when making decisions on agricultural policy.

See also
Third Worldism
Pan-Africanism
Socialism with Chinese characteristics
Arab socialism
Melanesian socialism
Ubuntu
Uhuru Movement
Ujamaa
Harambee
Third International Theory
Sankarism

Notes

References

 Bismarck U. Mwansasu and Cranford Pratt, Towards Socialism in Tanzania, University of Toronto Press, Toronto, 1979.
 Fenner Brockway, African Socialism, The Bodley Head, London, 1963.
 Ghita Jonescu and Ernest Gellner, Populism, Weidenfeld & Nicolson, London, 1969.
 Harambee. (2018, February 6). In Wikipedia. Retrieved from https://en.wikipedia.org/w/index.php?title=Harambee&oldid=824361904
 Ngau, P. M. (1987). Tensions in Empowerment: The Experience of the “Harambee” (Self-Help) Movement in Kenya. Economic Development and Cultural Change, 35(3), 523–538.
Ng’ethe, N. (1983). POLITICS, IDEOLOGY AND THE UNDERPRIVILEGED: THE ORIGINS AND NATURE OF THE HARAMBEE PHENOMENON IN KENYA. Journal of Eastern African Research & Development, 13, 150–170.
 Paolo Andreocci, Democrazia, partito unico e populismo nel pensiero politico africano, in Africa, Rome, n. 2–3, 1969.
 Peter Worsley, The Third World, Weidenfeld & Nicolson, London, 1964.
 William H. Crawford and Carl G. Rosberg Jr., African Socialism, Stanford University press, California, 1964.
 Ngau, P. M. (1987). Tensions in Empowerment: The Experience of the “Harambee” (Self-Help) Movement in Kenya. Economic Development and Cultural Change, 35(3), 523–538.
 Ng’ethe, N. (1983). POLITICS, IDEOLOGY AND THE UNDERPRIVILEGED: THE ORIGINS AND NATURE OF THE HARAMBEE PHENOMENON IN KENYA. Journal of Eastern African Research & Development, 13, 150–170.
 Smith, J. H. (1992). [Review of Review of The Harambee Movement in Kenya: Self-Help, Development and Education among the Kamba of Kitui District, by M. J. D. Hill]. The Journal of Modern African Studies, 30(4), 701–703.
 Yves Bénot, Idélogies des Indepéndances africaines, F. Maspero, Paris, 1969.
 

 
Politics of Africa
African and Black nationalism
Socialism in Africa
Left-wing politics in Africa